Lindsay Place High School (LPHS) is a former public high school situated in Pointe-Claire, Quebec, on the island of Montreal. It was part of the Lester B. Pearson School Board.

It opened in September 1962, named after Lindsay H. Place, a Montreal judge who volunteered for the Protestant School Commission, as it was then known.

In the 2006–2007 school year the school began offering a new program to students interested in music. The program consisted of private lessons, multiple before school rehearsals and music theory and history classes, called the Arts-Etude program.

The Lester B. Pearson School Board will be moving St. Thomas High School students into Lindsay Place High School on Broadview Avenue in Pointe-Claire in July 2021. Lindsay Place High School, which opened in 1962, will become St. Thomas High School once the process is complete.

Notable alumnus
 Bruce Dowbiggin, journalist and sportscaster
 Greg Fergus, politician

References

External links
 Alumni site

English-language schools in Quebec
Education in Pointe-Claire
Lester B. Pearson School Board
High schools in Montreal
Buildings and structures in Pointe-Claire